Kung Karls jakt (English: King Charles' Hunt; Finnish: Kaarle-kuninkaan metsästys) is an opera with music by Fredrik Pacius and a libretto by Zacharias Topelius. It was the first opera to be composed in Finland. Kung Karls jakt was first performed in Helsinki on 24 March 1852. Although the text is in Swedish (Swedish and Finnish are both official languages in Finland) it concerns an event from Finnish history when Finland was a province of Sweden in the 17th century. The work takes the form of a Singspiel with spoken dialogue between the musical numbers (the king himself does not sing). The music is heavily influenced by contemporary German and Italian opera, with a few Finnish elements such as the use of a kantele in one scene.

Roles

Synopsis
The plot concerns the visit of the young King Charles XI to Åland to go hunting. Leonora, the daughter of a local fisherman, learns of a plot against the king's life and saves him. In return, the king spares the life of her fiancé Jonathan, who has been condemned to death for killing one of the royal elks.

Recordings
Kung Karls Jakt Soloists, Jubilate Choir, Finnish National Opera Orchestra, conducted by Ulf Söderblom (Finlandia, 1991)
The Hunt of King Charles (sung in Finnish translation) ( Kaarle-Kuninkaan Metsästys, in Finnish language) Soloists, Pori Opera Choir, Pori Sinfonietta, conducted by Ari Rasilainen (Marco Polo, 2007)

Sources
Ruth-Esther Hillila and Barbara Blanchard Hong: Historical Dictionary of the Music and Musicians of Finland (Greenwood, 1997) p. 293
Donald Jay Grout A Short History of Opera (Columbia University Press, 2003 ed.) p. 547
Penguin Guide to Opera on Compact Discs (1993) pp. 282–283

Operas
1852 operas
Swedish-language operas
Operas by Fredrik Pacius